Robert J. "Bob" Bischoff is an American Democratic legislator who served as a member of the Indiana House of Representatives, representing the 68th District from 1980 until 2010.
Earlier he was a member of the Indiana Senate from 1977 through 1978.

References

External links
Project Vote Smart - Representative Robert J. 'Bob' Bischoff (IN) profile
Follow the Money - Bob Bischoff
2008 2006 2004 2002 2000 campaign contributions

Democratic Party members of the Indiana House of Representatives
Democratic Party Indiana state senators
1941 births
Living people
People from Batesville, Indiana
People from Dearborn County, Indiana